One Arts Plaza is a 24-story skyscraper located at 1722 Routh Street in the Arts District of downtown Dallas, Texas (USA). It is easily recognizable by a large LED illuminated square on the east and west sides of the building, which can gradually change colors. This feature was developed by Scott Oldner, a prominent LED lighting designer, and serves as the architectural book-end for the arts district.

The building formerly housed the headquarters of U.S. 7-Eleven operations.

Current tenants

Billingsley Company
Charlie Uniform Tango
Knoll
Nomura Research Institute
The Playwright Irish Pub
Rene Rouleau
Resource One Credit Union
7-Eleven
TACA
Tei An
Thompson & Knight LLP
ThyssenKrupp
Yolk

See also

Two Arts Plaza

References

External links 

 One Arts Plaza
 The Billingsley Company

Skyscraper office buildings in Dallas
Downtown Dallas
Office buildings completed in 2007